Jean-Claude Baulu (15 June 1936 – 23 October 2020) was a French footballer.

Biography
Upon his arrival at Valenciennes FC and AS Saint-Étienne, Baulu evolved to become a striker. With the Verts, he won the Coupe de France in 1962 and the championship in 1964. He scored the winning goal in the 86th minute to win the Coupe de France, giving Saint-Étienne its first such victory in history. He finished his playing career in 1965 with Olympique de Marseille.

Awards
Finalist in the Coupe Charles Drago (1959)
Winner of the Coupe de France (1962)
Two Selections for the French Division 2 Team (1962, 1963)
Ligue 2 Champion (1963)
Ligue 1 Champion (1964)

References

External links
 

1936 births
2020 deaths
French footballers
Association football midfielders
Stade Français (association football) players
Valenciennes FC players
AS Saint-Étienne players
Olympique de Marseille players
Ligue 1 players
Ligue 2 players
People from Courbevoie